Green Grow the Rushes is a 1951 British comedy film directed by Derek N. Twist and starring Roger Livesey, Richard Burton and Honor Blackman. It was the first film to be released by ACT Films, an entity formed by a trade union for filmmakers. The film was produced by John Gossage and funded by the National Film Finance Corporation and the Co-Operative Wholesale Society Bank. It is an adaptation of the 1949 novel of the same title  by Howard Clewes.

It was made at Elstree Studios near London with sets the designed by the art director Frederick Pusey. Location shooting took place on the coastal Romney Marsh around the town of New Romney.

Plot
Three British government bureaucrats arrive in Kent to inquire as to why the coastal Anderida marsh is not being cultivated. The reason is that most of the local people know about or are involved in the liquor smuggling scheme operated by Captain Biddle and his accomplice Robert (Richard Burton), who is posing as a fisherman when he is seen by the newspaper editor and his journalist daughter Meg.

Robert persuades them not to report it in the newspaper, and tells Biddle about his encounter with them. Biddle does not like the idea of any local "Lily White" (woman) knowing about their illegal activity; he was once married to a Lily White. The smugglers’ next cargo gets caught in a violent storm, and their boat washes inland, settling in the meadow of a farmer whose wife Polly happens to be Biddle’s ex-wife.

Cast

Background
Based on the 1949 novel Green Grow the Rushes by Howard Clewes. The title, at least, is inspired by the 18th-century folk song "Green Grow the Rushes, O", in which each of the 12 verses after the first has the penultimate line, "Two, two, the lily-white boys, clothed all in green O."

Release
The film recouped its cost. However the NFFC rejected ACT's next two proposed projects, films about Sir William Hastings and the Tolpuddle Martyrs. So the company made less politically active films from then on. The film was re-released in 1954 under the alternative title Brandy Ashore.

See also
 Variety (weekly) 21 November 1951.

References

External links
 
 

1951 films
1951 comedy films
Seafaring films
British black-and-white films
Films shot at Associated British Studios
Films based on British novels
Films directed by Derek Twist
Films set on beaches
Films set in Kent
British comedy films
1950s English-language films
1950s British films